Michael Daniel Ness (born April 3, 1962) is an American musician who is the lead guitarist, vocalist and songwriter for the punk rock band Social Distortion, which was formed in 1978.

Early life 
Ness was born in Lynn, Massachusetts on April 3, 1962. His family relocated to Orange County, California, later that year, and he grew up in Fullerton. As a child, he idolized gangsters such as John Dillinger and Bonnie and Clyde. At a young age, his parents divorced and he was later kicked out of his father and stepmother's home in Fullerton when he was around 15 or 16 years old for not valuing orange juice.

During his early years, Ness was raised on the blues, country and early rock n' roll. As he drifted around Orange County, Ness became involved in the punk rock scene.

In the 1980s, Ness was the original renter of the one-bedroom apartment described in The Adolescents song "Kids of the Black Hole". The punk house is located in Fullerton and still exists today.

Career 

Inspired by The Sex Pistols, Ness founded Social Distortion in 1978 with Casey Royer. He later recruited his high school friend Dennis Danell into the band in 1979, and Ness dropped out of high school at age 17 to focus on his music career. Social Distortion released the Mainliner/Playpen 7" record on Robbie Field's indie label Posh Boy Records in 1981. Two years later, they released the album Mommy's Little Monster (1983) on 13th Floor Records, which was owned by Monk Rock, their manager at the time.

Ness was featured in the independent film Another State of Mind, which chronicled Social Distortion's first cross-country tour with Youth Brigade. It was on the DVD commentary where he claimed to have never had anything to do with the armed forces or religion. This prompted many fans to consider him an atheist, though some of his lyrics seem to indicate otherwise. Five years passed before Social Distortion released their next album, 1988's Prison Bound, on the heels of Ness's recovery from drug addiction.

Ness performed in the band Easter from 1986 until 1988 and appeared in the music video for the songs "Slipping Away" and "Lights Out". In 1989, Social Distortion signed a deal with Epic Records and released three albums with that label: Social Distortion (1990), Somewhere Between Heaven and Hell (1992) and White Light, White Heat, White Trash (1996).

The band left Epic Records after White Light, White Heat, White Trash (1996) and Ness formed Time Bomb Recordings, releasing Mainliner: Wreckage From the Past (a collection of old recordings and singles that were done in the early '80s), a re-issue of the long out of print Mommy's Little Monster, along with a re-issue of their second album Prison Bound, and Live at the Roxy (1998). Ness married his wife, Christine Marie, in the late 1990s and they have two sons, Julian (born in 1992) and Johnny, Mike's stepson (born 1997).

In 1999, Ness released his first solo album, Cheating at Solitaire. Although some of Social Distortion's songs paid homage to country music artists, Cheating at Solitaire was an unalloyed expression of Ness' country influences. Solitaire included guest appearances by Bruce Springsteen, Brian Setzer, Billy Zoom and Josh Freese, as well as members of Royal Crown Revue. Springsteen had touted Social Distortion's Heaven and Hell as his favorite record of the year in a Rolling Stone interview in 1992.

Ness continued in this vein, releasing a compilation of country covers entitled Under the Influences that same year. Both albums came out on Time Bomb Recordings. Ness toured extensively in the US in support of these albums, backed by the 2006 partial incarnation of Social Distortion: ex-Plugz and Bob Dylan drummer Charlie Quintana and Brent Harding (upright and electric bass). Ness and the band played at Woodstock '99.

Childhood friend and founding member of Social Distortion guitarist Dennis Danell died on February 29, 2000, at 38 due to a brain aneurysm. According to other sources, the Orange County Coroner's Office lists his death as "Idiopathic Dilated Cardiomyopathy." Ness was devastated, stating "I am saddened beyond any possible form of expression. Dennis and I have been friends since boyhood, starting Social Distortion together while we were in high school. My deepest regrets to his family."

Social Distortion went back to work in June 2000 on the album Sex, Love and Rock 'n' Roll. Many of the songs on this new album are dedicated to Danell, such as "Don't Take Me For Granted", "Reach for the Sky" and "Angel's Wings". At an October 2010 concert in New York City Ness dedicated "Don't Take Me For Granted" to Joey Ramone.

In 2003, Social Distortion recorded a live DVD called Live in Orange County at the House of Blues in Anaheim, California which was released in 2004 along with Sex, Love and Rock 'n' Roll, both of which were released on Time Bomb Recordings.

These efforts marked the first recordings with a line-up consisting of Ness on guitar and vocals, Wickersham replacing Danell on guitar, and Quintana on drums. It also consisted of a number of songs co-written by Ness and Wickersham. This is the first time Ness collaborated with another songwriter since his 1990 self-titled album, on which he and then bassist John Maurer wrote "So Far Away". The band's lineup changed twice after Maurer left the band, just a month before the release of Sex, Love and Rock 'n' Roll.

In February 2006, Ness broke his wrist while skateboarding in Las Vegas. He continued to perform vocals on the tour while T.S.O.L. guitarist Ron Emory filled in on guitar until Ness recovered from the injury. On January 18, 2007, former Social Distortion bass player Brent Liles died after being hit by a tractor trailer truck. Ness dedicated a performance at the Anaheim House of Blues to him shortly after.

Despite earlier reports that the band would begin recording their next studio album by 2008, Social Distortion took a hiatus from touring and recording, when Ness was on tour with his solo band which is composed of two current members of Social Distortion, Brent Harding and Jonny Wickersham.

Also touring with Ness were Chris Lawrence on Telecaster and pedal steel guitar and Dave Raven on drums. In a July 2009 interview with Tarakany! Bad TV, Ness stated that Social Distortion was planning to return to the studio in December of that year or the beginning of 2010 to begin recording their seventh album. The album, now known as Hard Times and Nursery Rhymes, was finally released on January 18, 2011.

On May 17, 2008, Ness and his band were joined on stage by Bruce Springsteen at the Stone Pony in Asbury Park, New Jersey for the encore. Songs played were "Misery Loves Company", "Ball and Chain", "If You Leave Before Me" and "I Fought the Law".

On April 16, 2009, Ness joined Springsteen and the E Street Band on stage at the Los Angeles Sports Arena. Songs played included Social Distortion's "Bad Luck" and Springsteen's "The Rising". On May 18, 2009, Mike Ness and Social Distortion played a benefit show at the House of Blues in Anaheim, California called "Rock to Recovery" and his son joined him on stage and played lead guitar for the song "Ball and Chain".

Personal life 
Ness currently lives in Santa Ana, California, with his wife Christine and two sons. He is an avid collector of vintage ephemera such as Hamburglar toys and hot rods, owning a 1954 Chevrolet and a 1936 Ford. In 2003, he founded Black Kat Kustoms with "long time hot rodder and builder" Don Nemarnik. Black Kat Kustoms is an expression of his love for hot rods, cats, bikes, and counter-culture clothing.

In a 2015 interview with Eric Walden, he said in reference to the song "Ball and Chain", "It was basically, 'I've seen God,' I guess if you will — God of my understanding; I'm not a religious guy; I do consider myself a spiritual man."

Equipment

Electric Guitars 
Early in his career, Ness was seen using Gibson SGs and SG Juniors but he currently uses 1970s Gibson Les Paul Deluxes (a 1971 sunburst, a 1975 sunburst, a 1975 goldtop and a 1976 goldtop). His 1976 goldtop is his favorite and most used guitar currently, however his 1971 sunburst was his main guitar for many years, especially through the 1990s. Ness uses Eb Standard tuning and usually uses a capo on the second fret while using his goldtops. He has used Seymour Duncan P-90 pickups in all of his guitars since touring with Neil Young in the early 1990s (Ness recalled seeing Young's guitar tech take the stock mini humbucker pickups out of a Les Paul Deluxe, throw them in the trash and replace them with the P-90s). Ness' goldtops have maple necks which he says contribute to his tone especially when using a capo on the second fret. He also once used a non-reverse Gibson Firebird, as seen on the back cover of Social Distortion's 1983 debut Mommy's Little Monster, and a white Gibson Les Paul Custom in the videos for "Ball and Chain" and "Story of My Life".

Acoustic Guitars 
In an interview with Guitar.com Ness said: "The guitar that I write on is a 1940 Gibson J-45. I have three of them – I searched high and low for them. I had a 1940 Martin D-18 that I sold last year; I'm just a Gibson guy. I gravitate to the Gibson J-45 every time I write. It's a balladeer's guitar". Ness also plays a 1939 Gibson J-35, that he says "...very rarely leaves the house...".

Amplifiers 
Ness uses Fender Bassman amps modified by Fred Taccone of Divided by 13 through Marshall 4x12 slant cabs with Celestion Greenback speakers. Most of his touring amps were modded by Billy Zoom of the band X fame. Billy's mods include a wattage switch to select between 40, 20 or 10 watts, replacing the bass channel with a higher gain channel. The only effect pedal Ness uses live is an overdrive, previously a Boss SD-1 and currently a Klon Centaur, though he has used various delays in the studio.

Discography

Solo 

Cheating at Solitaire (1999)
Under the Influences (1999)

Social Distortion 

Mommy's Little Monster (1983)
Prison Bound (1988)
Social Distortion (1990)
Somewhere Between Heaven And Hell (1992)
White Light, White Heat, White Trash (1996)
Sex, Love and Rock 'n' Roll (2004)
Hard Times and Nursery Rhymes (2011)

Other appearances 
The Band Easter (1980)
Another State of Mind (1984)
Frezno Smooth
Easter (1986–1988)
Live at the Hootenanny, Vol. 1 (2000)
Live in Orange County (2004)
Punk's Not Dead (2007)

References

External links 

BlackKatCustoms.com
Interview with Mike Ness (2007)
Interview with Mike Ness (2005)

Living people
1962 births
American alternative country singers
American country guitarists
American country rock singers
American country rock musicians
American male guitarists
American baritones
House painters
American male singer-songwriters
American punk rock guitarists
American punk rock singers
American country singer-songwriters
Cowpunk musicians
Lead guitarists
Musicians from Fullerton, California
Social Distortion members
Guitarists from California
20th-century American guitarists
Singer-songwriters from California